Yasemin Ustalar (later Yasemin Çabuk) is a Turkish female boxer. She was born in  Şereflikoçhisar (1975). She won a silver medal in the 63.5 kg category at the 2002 Women's World Amateur Boxing Championships held in Antalya, Turkey.

References

Turkish women boxers
Living people
Light-welterweight boxers
1975 births
People from Şereflikoçhisar

AIBA Women's World Boxing Championships medalists
20th-century Turkish sportswomen
21st-century Turkish sportswomen